Hessam Nowzari is the Director of the University of Southern California Advanced Periodontics program, since 1995, and is a diplomate of the American Board of Periodontology.

Biography
Nowzari was born in Shiraz, Iran and was the youngest director at the University of Southern California Advanced Periodontics program (1995-2012) where he established a program that mirror's Nowzari's stances on key issues in periodontology. 

Nowzari is the founder of the Taipei Academy of Reconstructive Dentistry in Taiwan and one of only two American members of the Dnipropetrovsk State Academy of Medical Sciences in Ukraine. For the first time in the recent history of Israel, he was the first non-Jewish Iranian of a Persian heritage to be the keynote speaker at the Israel Dental Association Congress, possibly the largest dental event to be held in Israel. 

In 2002, he joined the National Institute of Transplantation (NIT) to study the relationship between periodontal disease and transplant complications. He is also an editor of one of the leading reference publications, Aesthetic Periodontal Therapy: Periodontology 2000.   

He also established a periodontic/orthodontic course at the University of Southern California. Its biological research stresses the role of viruses, mainly the herpes virus family, in periodontal disease. Surgically, it is known for its position against using animal or human cadaver products in bone or soft tissue augmentation due to their potential for contamination of the surgical site. Nowzari is known for his advocacy against early in life periodontal disease (aggressive periodontitis). In an effort to bring international attention to this cause, he made the movie "The Enemy of the Smile: AA - An Ancient Bacterium" which debuted in 2010.

Research
In 1994, Nowzari challenged membrane guided tissue regeneration through a series of research publications, showing that the membrane is actually a source of infection to the grafted site.

Research in the field of bone grafting has been focused on autogenous sources
 Rafiel M. Rafiee. "Dental Papilla analysis: a multifactorial view point".

Orthodontics

Implantology

Guided Tissue Regeneration
The theory of guiding periodontal healing with the use of a barrier membrane was challenged by Nowzari and Jorgen Slots in a series of articles: Guided bone and tissue regeneration.

References

Year of birth missing (living people)
Living people
American dentists
University of Southern California faculty
American dentistry academics
Iranian emigrants to the United States